The South End (Soufend) is a group of neighborhoods in the southeast of Seattle, Washington, U.S.A. The definition is a bit fluid, but has traditionally included the area south of the Central District, and east of Interstate 5: Rainier Valley, Columbia City, Rainier Beach, Seward Park, Mount Baker, and Beacon Hill. Sometimes its definition is extended to Skyway and Bryn Mawr in unincorporated King County, though these are not technically in the city. Other definitions have included northern parts of Renton and Tukwila, though most Seattleites, especially those from the South End, would consider this usage incorrect. Often the term "South End" is used colloquially to include neighboring portions of South King County, by people living in those areas, due to that area's location in reference to Seattle proper.

The South End has traditionally been a diverse neighborhood with a mix of Caucasian, African American, Latino and Asian communities. It is currently going through a period of redevelopment and gentrification, and was a target of former Seattle Mayor Greg Nickels's action agenda and Sound Transit's Link light rail. There is a high school sports rivalry between the South End's high schools Rainier Beach and Franklin and the Central District's Garfield. Today the neighborhood has a population of 84,180 and is 34% Asian, 27% White or Caucasian, 23% Black or African-American, 8% Hispanic and 5% other races or of mixed race.

Notes

External links
 Elizabeth Rhodes, Sitting pretty in Seattle's South End, Seattle Times, Tuesday, March 7, 2000. Article about real estate in the South End
 Vanessa Ho, Mike Lewis, and Phuong Cat Le, School closure criteria could work against South End, Seattle Post-Intelligencer, March 4, 2006.

Neighborhoods in Seattle